Powershifting, also known as full-throttle shifting or flat-shifting (not to be confused with evertons power shift), is a method of shifting used with manual transmissions to reduce the time where the driving wheels are not powered.
Unlike a normal gearchange, in a powershift the driver does not let off the accelerator (unlike speed-shifting, where the throttle is let off very quickly, simultaneously depressing the clutch and shifting into the next gear, rapidly).  The clutch is briefly depressed while the shift lever is rapidly shifted into a higher gear, keeping the engine in its power band. Keeping the engine in its powerband allows it to put down power quicker when the clutch is "dropped" and power returns to the transmission. In most cases, there is a method of cutting the ignition or fuel delivery, in a manner similar to a rev-limiter, which prevents the engine from over-revving when the load from the transmission is removed.  Many aftermarket engine management systems provide this functionality as either a standard feature or as an option, usually combined with launch control.

See also
Shift kit
Shift time

References 

Driving techniques